East Haven Academy is a public Magnet school in East Haven, Connecticut that enrolls children in grades 1-8.  It opened on September 3, 1997.  In 2005 "
EHA" was recognized as a Blue Ribbon School by the U.S. Department of Education.
In September 2007 a team of four 8th grade students from EHA won Gold Medals in
the Science Olympics held at Academy of Our Lady of Mercy, Lauralton Hall which tested teams of students in the subject areas of Physics, Chemistry, Geology, and Biology.  The school maintains an active chapter of the National Junior Honor Society.

References

External links 
 East Haven Academy

East Haven, Connecticut
Schools in New Haven County, Connecticut
Public elementary schools in Connecticut
Public middle schools in Connecticut
Magnet schools in Connecticut
1997 establishments in Connecticut
Educational institutions established in 1997